Shihab al-Tamimi (died 27 February 2008) was an Iraqi journalist and head of the Journalists Syndicate. He was a fierce critic of Iraqi sectarian violence.

He was shot in the chest on 24 February 2008 by gunmen in Baghdad. He died of a heart attack three days later.

References

Year of birth missing
2008 deaths
Journalists killed while covering the Iraq War
Assassinated Iraqi journalists